The Young People's Front for Democracy and Justice (YPFDJ) is a nationalist Eritrean diaspora youth organization and the youth branch of their parent organization, the People's Front for Democracy and Justice (Eritrea's sole legal political party). Conferences are held throughout the world by local chapters, particularly in North America and Europe. 

Conferences have included both PFDJ dignitaries, members of the Eritrean government as well as non-Eritrean speakers.

References

External links 
 Official YPFDJ Website
 Official PFDJ Website
 Young People's Front for Democracy and Justice channel on Youtube
  International Peace Research Institute

Politics of Eritrea
Political organisations based in Eritrea
Youth wings of political parties in Eritrea
Society of Eritrea